The YMCA Central Building or Olympic Towers as the building is now known, is a historic YMCA building located at Buffalo in Erie County, New York. The tan-colored brick building with sandstone accents was designed by noted local architects Green & Wicks and constructed in 1901–1902. The building was home to the third oldest YMCA chapter in North America until converted to office use in the early 1980s.

History
The building complex consists of an English-Flemish Revival style building with a 10-story tower, a 4-story glass and steel office structure which was added in 1986, and a 4-story connecting atrium.
 
In January 2012, the building was sold for US$2.5 million.

It was listed on the National Register of Historic Places in 1983.

References

External links

 Young Men's Christian Association Central Building - U.S. National Register of Historic Places on Waymarking.com
 Y.M.C.A. and Men's Hotel, Buffalo, N. Y. -- Historic postcard images
 Olympic Towers Skyscraper page
 Olympic Towers Emporis page

Buffalo
Clubhouses on the National Register of Historic Places in New York (state)
Renaissance Revival architecture in New York (state)
Cultural infrastructure completed in 1902
Skyscraper office buildings in Buffalo, New York
National Register of Historic Places in Buffalo, New York
Green & Wicks buildings